Amy Forsyth (born 6 August 1995) is a Canadian actress. On television, she appeared as a series regular on the Hulu drama The Path (2016–17), the second season of SyFy horror anthology Channel Zero (2017), and the NBC musical drama Rise (2018), along with recurring roles on the science fiction Western Defiance (2014–15) and the historical drama The Gilded Age (2022). She also appeared in the horror films A Christmas Horror Story (2015), Hell Fest (2018), and We Summon the Darkness (2020) and the drama films Beautiful Boy (2018), CODA (2021), and The Novice (2021).

Filmography

Film

Television

References

External links
 

1995 births
Canadian film actresses
Canadian television actresses
Living people